Thomas Ward Wilson (1 April 1849 – 4 January 1924) was an English first-class cricketer active 1869–1871 who played for Cambridge University. He was born in Nocton and died in Broadstone, Dorset. He appeared in eight first-class matches as a right-handed batsman who bowled fast or medium pace roundarm. Wilson scored 171 career runs with a highest score of 50; he held one catch and took 17 wickets with a best return of five for 25.

Notes

1849 births
1924 deaths
English cricketers
Cambridge University cricketers
Gentlemen of England cricketers
Alumni of St John's College, Cambridge
People educated at Repton School
People from North Kesteven District